Sarah Anderson may refer to:
Sarah Anderson (curler) (born 1995), American curler
Sarah Anderson (Minnesota politician) (born 1972), member of the Minnesota House of Representatives
Sarah A. Anderson (1901–1992), member of the Pennsylvania House of Representatives
Sarah E. Anderson (1853–1900), member of the Utah State Legislature
Sarah Pia Anderson (born 1952), British television and theatre director

Sari Anderson (Sarah R. Anderson, born 1978), American multisport and endurance athlete

Fictional characters
Sarah Anderson, a character in the 1987 American teen comedy film Adventures in Babysitting

Schools named after Sarah Anderson (1922–1981), American educator
PS 9 Sarah Anderson School, an elementary in Manhattan, New York City
The Anderson School, a K-8 school for intellectually gifted children in New York City

See also
Sara Anderson Immerwahr (nee Sara Anderson, 1914–2008), American archaeologist
Sarah Andersen, American cartoonist, creator of Sarah's Scribbles
Sarah Andersen (Hollyoaks), a character on the soap opera Hollyoaks
Sarah Anderson (ship)